The punctuated snake eel (Ophichthus remiger, also known as the common snake eel in Peru) is an eel in the family Ophichthidae (worm/snake eels). It was described by Achille Valenciennes in 1837, originally under the genus Ophisurus. It is a marine, subtropical eel which is known from the eastern central and southeastern Pacific Ocean, including Nicaragua, Chile, Colombia, Costa Rica, Ecuador, Peru, and Panama.

The species epithet "remniger" refers to the type locality, Port Rame, in Chile. The Punctuated snake-eel's diet consists of fish and invertebrates. It is of commercial interest to Ecuadorian and Peruvian fisheries.

Due to its wide distribution, lack of known major threats, and lack of observed population decline, the IUCN redlist currently lists the Punctuated snake-eel as Least Concern.

References

Taxa named by Achille Valenciennes
Fish described in 1837
Ophichthus